Charles Lane Poor (January 18, 1866 – September 27, 1951) was an American astronomy professor, noted for his opposition to Einstein's theory of relativity.

Biography
He was born on January 18, 1866, in Hackensack, New Jersey, to Edward Erie Poor.

He graduated from the City College of New York and received a PhD in 1892 from Johns Hopkins University. Poor became an astronomer and professor of celestial mechanics at Columbia University from 1903 to 1944, when he was named Professor Emeritus. He published several works disputing the evidence for Einstein's theory of relativity during the 1920s, and reflecting objections to the theory.

For 25 years, Poor was chairman of the admissions committee of the New York Yacht Club. In addition, he was a fellow of the Royal Astronomical Society and an associate fellow of the American Academy of Arts and Sciences.  He served several terms as mayor of Dering Harbor on Long Island, New York, and invented a "line of position computers" for yachting navigation.  At Columbia University, Poor was a teacher of the astronomer Samuel A. Mitchell, who went on to become director of the Leander McCormick Observatory at the University of Virginia.

He died on September 27, 1951.

Legacy
One of Poor's sons, Edmund Ward Poor, was one of ten co-founders of Grumman Aircraft on Long Island. Another son was Alfred Easton Poor, an architect.

Selected publications

The Solar System: A Study of Recent Observations (1908)
Nautical Science (1910)
Gravitation versus Relativity (with a preliminary essay by Thomas Chrowder Chamberlin, 1922)
Is Einstein Wrong? A Debate (Jun. 1924)
Rebuttal to Prof. Henderson's Article (Aug. 1924)
The Relativity Deflection of Light (Jul. 1927)
Relativity and the Law of Gravitation (Jan. 1930)
The Deflection of Light as Observed at Total Solar Eclipses (Apr. 1930)
What Einstein Really Did (Nov. 1930)

See also
Criticism of relativity theory

References

American astronomers
Johns Hopkins University alumni
City College of New York alumni
Columbia University faculty
People from Hackensack, New Jersey
1866 births
1951 deaths
Members of the New York Yacht Club
Relativity critics